The name Gäu (derived from the Roman pagus - a territory ruled by a lord - or from the Alemannic gou for Gau - a region) is used primarily today for a sparsely wooded cultural landscape type, that has evolved on the South German Scarplands between the Black Forest, the Stromberg and Heuchelberg in the west and the Swabian Jura and Swabian Keuperwald Hills in the east. Because the region is further subdivided into the Oberes Gäu or Korngäu, Heckengäu, Strohgäu and Zabergäu it is also referred to as die Gäue (pl).

Natural regional characteristics 
The Gäu is a plateau, about 250 to 500 metres above sea level, comprising rocks of the muschelkalk and Lettenkeuper which has been deeply incised in places by the rivers Neckar, Ammer, Würm, Glems, Enz, Metter and Zaber.
In the north the Swabian Gäu landscapes transition into the uplands of Bauland and Tauberland, in the west they are bounded by the Black Forest, in the east by the Swabian Jura and by the Keuper Upland regions of Schönbuch, Glemswald and the Swabian Forest. 

The Gäue are intensively farmed regions, whose soils mainly consist of brown earths (Parabraunerden) on loess. In the so-called Poor Gäue (Arme Gäue) there is no covering of loess: on the karstified limestones of the Upper Muschelkalk, generally only shallow and less fertile rendzinas have developed. Hedges have formed on the Lesesteinriegeln (Heckengäu).

Comparable landscapes in the immediate vicinity bordering on those of the Gäu are the Schmidener Feld near Fellbach and the Backnang Bight east of the Middle Neckar.

See also 
 Gäu Plateaus - a natural region largely coterminous with the Gäu.

Regions of Baden-Württemberg
Natural regions of the South German Scarplands